The Museum of Native American History is a non-profit, handicapped-accessible museum of Native American history, art, and culture located in Bentonville, Arkansas. The museum was founded in 2006 by David Bogle, a local businessman and registered member of the Cherokee Nation.

The Museum of Native American History’s mission is to educate future generations about the lives of the First Americans. The museum provides a cultural hub to amplify the voices of their legacy.

The museum features artifacts from across the Americas covering over 14,000 years of history. The museum chooses to focus on the broader history of Native Americans as a whole, rather than any specific tribe and is laid out in roughly chronological order beginning around 12,000 BC and ending around 1900 AD.

The museum offers free admission and will welcome 34,000 guests in 2022, with indications that attendance will continue to climb in the coming years. The museum is routinely listed as the second most popular attraction in Bentonville, following Crystal Bridges Museum of American Art.

History 
David Bogle began his personal collection by purchasing an arrowhead collection from his childhood scoutmaster, and over time his personal collection grew exponentially. He began exploring opportunities to display his collection as well as to educate others in a deeper way about how Native Americans actually lived. That process resulted in the founding of the museum in 2006 in a converted house. The museum also includes items from the University of Arkansas museum that ceased operations in 2003.

The museum relocated into its current space in 2008, and it has been expanded 3 times in the last decade to its current footprint of 13,500 square feet to accommodate the growing collection.

The museum collection was further bolstered by an additional 1500 Meso-American items donated by Jim and Nancy Blair in 2015, adding new items from Southern Mexico, Central America and South America.

Native American Cultural Celebration 
The museum hosts an annual Native American Cultural Celebration featuring concerts, workshops, speakers and film screenings. The Fall 2021 celebration hosted over 20,000 visitors online and in person. This year, our 5th annual celebration marks the first hybrid event held.

Dia de los Muertos
The museum also hosts an annual community event Dia de los Muertos.

Permanent galleries

Paleo 
This gallery focuses on the earliest time periods of humans in the Americas, from around 12,000 BC to 8,000 BC. Included as part of the collection is "Tusker", an authentic Woolly Mammoth skeleton which greets visitors upon their arrival.

Archaic 
This gallery focuses on the shift toward the time of "Hunters and Gatherers" once the Mega-Fauna had perished and people began living in small semi-permanent villages and gathering food for themselves. This gallery has many examples of Archaic period tools and weapons, including Atl-atl specimens.

Woodlands 
Covering the time from 1,000 BC to 900 AD, The Woodlands period is unique due to the development of crop cultivation and larger social structures, as well as the development of earthen burial and ceremonial mounds.

Mississippian 
The Mississippian Period (lasting from 900 AD to 1450 AD) saw the development of larger villages and population centers. This period's prosperity led to some of the most intricate of all pottery samples that have survived to this day.

This gallery includes the Sweetwater Biface, which is considered to be the thinnest flint artifact yet found.

Historic 
The Historic period (lasting from 1650 AD to 1900 AD) includes the first contact and interactions of Native Americans with Europeans and continues until near present day.

Pre-Columbian 
The Pre-Columbian Gallery shifts a wider focus to artifacts from Mexico, Central America, and South America before the time of Columbus. Specific cultures represented are the Aztec, Maya, and Inca peoples.

Programs

Creative Visions 
Creative Visions is an interactive art-making workshop created by the Museum of Native American History in Bentonville, AR. The goal is to provide an opportunity for Native American art to be taught to people of all ages and heritages. Through a group art workshop with step-by-step instructions from an experienced Native American artist, culture will not only be preserved but spread. It will also create personal advancements for the artist and participants. #EducateNotSeparate.

Native Conversations 
Native Conversations is a lecture-style event held by scholars, artists, and advocates that hosts monthly events about ways to give voice to historical and contemporary Native American culture.

Hear Our Voices 
The Hear Our Voices series features, storytellers, from various indigenous nations, bringing in knowledge and wisdom through the telling of traditional oral tales. Each month, we host an indigenous storyteller.

References

External links
 Museum of Native American History - official site

Museums in Benton County, Arkansas
Native American museums in Arkansas
2006 establishments in Arkansas
Museums established in 2006
Buildings and structures in Bentonville, Arkansas